The High Allegheny National Park and Preserve was a proposed National Park Service (NPS) unit in the Allegheny Mountains of eastern West Virginia. If approved, it would be established by transferring the northern portions of the Monongahela National Forest to the NPS, including the Spruce Knob–Seneca Rocks National Recreation Area (NRA); the Dolly Sods Wilderness; and the Otter Creek Wilderness. Western portions of the George Washington National Forest may also be included. Interconnecting public lands would become Preserve Areas, where hunting would be allowed; and adjacent private working farms and forests would be eligible for voluntary Heritage Area conservation easements.

In October 2011, the NPS announced  a Reconnaissance Survey, to be conducted from January to September 2012, to "determine whether the historic, natural, and recreational resources in the project area are 'likely' or 'unlikely' to meet congressionally required criteria for the designation of potential units of the National Park System". The survey was requested by West Virginia Senator Joe Manchin.

Historic Civil War sites within the proposed park and preserve include the Rich Mountain Battlefield, Beverly Historic District, Cheat Summit Fort, Camp Bartow, and Camp Allegheny. The historic Blackwater Industrial Complex in Tucker County — preserving artifacts of the coal, coke and timber empire of early West Virginia entrepreneur and Senator Henry Gassaway Davis — would also be included.

In early 2012 Senator Manchin dropped his request for the study. Commentators on Manchin's approach to the proposal had noted that "the senator seemed to be in favor of a possible NPS label in the area only if there were no changes in existing land use or management practices". On 28 February 2012, the NPS Director observed that some of Manchin's requests were incompatible with longstanding NPS policy, saying in part that "the continuation of extractive activities such as timber harvesting and oil and gas development would make the establishment of a national park infeasible".

References

External links
Friends of HANP&P Website

Monongahela National Forest
Land management in the United States
National Park Service
United States public land law
National Park Service proposed areas